is a passenger railway station located in Tsurumi-ku, Yokohama, Kanagawa Prefecture, Japan, operated by the private railway company Keikyū.

Lines

Station layout
The station consists of two ground-level opposed side platforms connected by an elevated station building built over the platforms and tracks.

History
Kagetsu-sōjiji Station opened on 12 April 1914. The station was rebuilt as an elevated station in December 1971.

The station was originally named for the adjacent Kagetsuen Amusement Park, which was in operation from 1914 until 1946. The amusement park property was later used for the Kagetsuen Keirin Stadium, which closed down in March 2010.

Keikyū introduced station numbering to its stations on 21 October 2010; Kagetsu-sōjiji Station was assigned station number KK30.

The name reflects the redevelopment of Kagetsuen following the closure of the Keirin track, as well as the nearby Sōji-ji Buddhist temple.

Passenger statistics
In fiscal 2019, the station was used by an average of 7,022 passengers daily. 

The passenger figures for previous years are as shown below.

Surrounding area
 Sōji-ji
Kokudo Station
 Japan National Route 15
Yokohama City Yokohama Science Frontier High School / Affiliated Junior High School

See also
 List of railway stations in Japan

References

External links

 

Railway stations in Kanagawa Prefecture
Railway stations in Japan opened in 1914
Keikyū Main Line
Railway stations in Yokohama